

Matches
Scores and results list England's points tally first.

The test with All Blacks 

New Zealand: 15. Doug Howlett, 14.Joe Rokocoko, 13.Ma'a Nonu, 12.Tana Umaga, 11.Caleb Ralph, 10.Carlos Spencer, 9.Justin Marshall, 8.Rodney So'oialo, 7.Richie McCaw, 6.Reuben Thorne (capt), 5.Ali Williams, 4.Chris Jack, 3.Greg Somerville, 2.Anton Oliver, 1.Dave Hewett, – replacements: 16.Keven Mealamu, 19.Jerry Collins, 22.Mils Muliaina       –  No entry : 17.Carl Hoeft, 18.Brad Thorn, 19.Jerry Collins, 21.Dan Carter
England: 15.Josh Lewsey, 14.Jason Robinson, 13.Will Greenwood, 12.Mike Tindall, 11.Ben Cohen, 10.Jonny Wilkinson, 9.Kyran Bracken, 8.Lawrence Dallaglio , 7.Neil Back , 6.Richard Hill, 5.Ben Kay, 4.Martin Johnson (capt.), 3.Jason Leonard, 2.Steve Thompson, 1.Graham Rowntree,  – replacements: 17.Phil Vickery, 19.Joe Worsley, 22.Dan Luger       –  No entry: 16.Dorian West, 18.Steve Borthwick, 20.Andy Gomarsall, 21.Paul Grayson

The Test with Wallabies 

Australia: Chris Latham, 14.Wendell Sailor, 13.Morgan Turinui, 12.Steve Kefu, 11.Joe Roff, 10.Nathan Grey, 9.George Gregan (capt), 1.Bill Young, 2.Jeremy Paul, 3.Patricio Noriega, 4.David Giffin, 5.Nathan Sharpe, 6.David Lyons, 7.Phil Waugh, 8.Toutai Kefu,  – replacements: 16.Brendan Cannon, 17.Ben Darwin, 18.Dan Vickerman, 21.Mat Rogers, 22.Lote Tuqiri     –  No entry : 19.Daniel Heenan, 20.Chris Whitaker
England: 15.Josh Lewsey, 14.Jason Robinson, 13.Will Greenwood, 12.Mike Tindall, 11.Ben Cohen, 10.Jonny Wilkinson, 9.Kyran Bracken, 8.Lawrence Dallaglio, 7.Neil Back, 6.Richard Hill, 5.Ben Kay, 4.Martin Johnson (capt.), 3.Phil Vickery, 2.Steve Thompson, 1.Trevor Woodman,  – replacements: 18.Steve Borthwick, 19.Joe Worsley, 20.Matt Dawson       –  No entry: 16.Mark Regan, 17.Jason Leonard, 21.Alex King, 22.Dan Luger

Match Reports

vs New Zealand
In the first half both teams scored two penalties to leave the half time score at 6–6. In the second half England scored two more penalties to go 12–6 up. England then had two men, Lawrence Dallaglio and Neil Back, sin binned. Despite this Wilkinson extended England's lead with a drop goal. New Zealand scored a to close the gap, but England won 15–13.

Touring party

Manager: Clive Woodward
Assistant Manager: 
Captain: Martin Johnson

Full back

Three-quarters
Jason Robinson, Will Greenwood, Mike Tindall, Ben Cohen, Dan Luger, Jamie Noon, Stuart Abbott, James Simpson-Daniel

Half-backs

Forwards
Lawrence Dallaglio, Neil Back, Richard Hill, Ben Kay, Martin Johnson, Jason Leonard, Steve Thompson, Graham Rowntree, Phil Vickery, Trevor Woodman, Joe Worsley, Matt Dawson

References 
 

 

 

tour
2003
2003
2003 in Australian rugby union
2003 in New Zealand rugby union